Ganji may refer to: kenyan sheng' word that means money

People
Akbar Ganji, Iranian journalist 
Manouchehr Ganji, Iranian human rights activist
Pariyoush Ganji, Iranian painter
Sadeq Ganji, Iranian politician

Places
Ganji, East Azerbaijan, Iran
Ganji, Kurdistan, Iran

See also
Ganji Bar
Rice, food staple grain grown in the tropics and subtropics
Congee, also spelled ganji